Okwui Okpokwasili (born August 6, 1972) is an American artist, performer, choreographer, and writer. Her multidisciplinary performances draw upon her training in theatre, and she describes her work as at "the intersection of theatre, dance, and the installation." Several of her works relate to historical events in Nigeria. She is especially interested in cultural and historical memory and how the Western imagination perceives African bodies.

Early life
The daughter of Igbo Nigerians who moved to the United States to escape the Nigerian Civil War in the late 1960s, Okpokwasili grew up in the Bronx, New York. She attended Yale University, where she met filmmaker Andrew Rossi, who made a documentary about her piece Bronx Gothic.

Career
Okpokwasili has become a key figure in the New York experimental dance scene. She is known for several one-woman performances and for her frequent collaborations with Ralph Lemon and Peter Born, her husband. Born often directs and designs the lighting and staging for Okpokwasili's performances.

She is also known for her role in the music video for Jay-Z's album 4:44 created by TNEG, a production company founded by Arthur Jafa.<ref>Sameer Rao, [https://www.colorlines.com/articles/4-questions-bronx-gothic-creator-and-star-okwui-okpokwasili "4 Questions for 'Bronx Gothic' Creator and Star Okwui Okpokwaili"], Color Lines, July 11, 2017.</ref>

In April 2017, she performed at Mass MOCA, responding to Nick Cave's massive installation work Until with a site-specific dance. The performance was co-sponsored by Jacob's Pillow Dance; choreographer Bill T. Jones performed earlier in the series of artists responding to Cave's installation.

She played the part of KK in Josephine Decker's 2018 film, Madeline's Madeline.

In a theatrical role, Okpokwasili performed the part of Hippolyta in Julie Taymor's 2013 production of Shakespeare's A Midsummer Night's Dream.

Works

Pent Up: A Revenge Dance
This was her first collaborative piece with her husband Born. She won a 2010 New York Dance Award and a 2009 Performance Bessie Award for Outstanding Production. Centering on a mother and daughter, the work considered cultural and generational clashes.

Bronx Gothic
In this 90-minute one-woman semi-autobiographical performance which she also choreographed, Okpokwasili plays two young black girls talking about growing up, feeling vulnerable, and discovering sexuality. As the audience enters, she is already on the stage and is trembling in a dark slip. Eventually, she begins to speak the dialogue of the two girls in conversation.

The work is the subject of a documentary by Andrew Rossi that shares the title of the performance work. 
The film illuminates the process of creating the work; includes clips of Okpokwasili answering questions from the audience when she toured the piece, and candid discussions with her husband about race; and features her parents and their reaction to her art. 
Cultural critic Hilton Als praised this piece in a 2017 review of Poor People's TV Room. The piece was commissioned by Danspace Project and Performance Space 122 in 2014.

when I return who will receive me
A group performance involving seven female performers singing, speaking, and dancing, this work was staged in the underground magazine of Fort Jay at Governors Island in July 2016 as part of The River to River Festival. This performance included fragments of research on Nigerian history as it relates to women's bodies that were used to develop Poor People's TV Room. During the two-hour duration of the performance, the audience was permitted to move through the space of the military cavern, while the performers moved throughout the installation spaces. The work was commissioned by the Lower Manhattan Cultural Council.

Poor People's TV Room
This work considers the subject of women's resistance movements in Nigeria, specifically the Women's War in 1929, when the country was under British rule, and the kidnapping of 300 schoolgirls in 2014 by Boko Haram. As part of this project, Okpokwasili also researched the film industry in Nigeria, known as Nollywood, considering representations of women in a cinema where African and Western cultures intersect.

In an interview with Jenn Joy for Bomb magazine, Okpokwasili stated that the piece "is about a critical absence that I feel when a tragedy happens—like the kidnapping of girls by Boko Haram and the Women's War in Nigeria. My work is not explicitly about the incredible women in northern Nigeria who came together to shame their government into doing something to get these 300 abducted girls back. African women are not just victims of colonizers and oppressive or corrupt governments. They have been building collectives and advocating and fighting to be visible for a long time. I don’t want to make documentary work—but I don’t want these women to disappear, either. My piece is about visibility."

She has cited as a major influence the Nigerian novelist Amos Tutuola, who is known for incorporating elements of Yoruba folklore into his works.

The research Okpokwasili completed for Poor People's TV Room also informed Sitting on a Man’s Head, a work the artist presented at the 2018 Berlin Biennale.

Awards and honors
Okpokwasili has received several Bessie Awards for her performances, including in works she has written and developed herself. In 2018, she was named a MacArthur Fellow, a prestigious "Genius Award" intended to enable recipients to further develop their talent.

Residencies
2013: New York Foundation for the Arts Fellowship in Choreography
2013: Visiting Artist at Rhode Island School of Design with Ralph Lemon
2014–15: Lower Manhattan Cultural Council's Extended Life Program
2016: Creative Capital Grant
2015–17: Randjelovic/Stryker Commissioned Artist at New York Live Arts

 References 

 External links 
 Excerpt of Bronx Gothic performance
 Trailer of Bronx Gothic documentary
 BRIC TV video on her artistic process
 Aubrey F. Burghardt, "Q&A: Retracing Narratives With MacArthur Genius Okwui Okpokwasili", Byline Houston'', April 12, 2019.

1972 births
Living people
21st-century American women artists
American choreographers
American people of Nigerian descent
American performance artists
American women choreographers
People from the Bronx
Women performance artists
Yale University alumni
MacArthur Fellows